Abdul-Fatai Alashe (born October 21, 1993) is an American professional soccer player.

Career

College and amateur
Alashe spent all four years of his college career at Michigan State University where he made a total of 86 appearances for the Spartans and tallied eight goals and eight assists.

He also played in the Premier Development League for Reading United and Portland Timbers U23s.

Professional
On January 15, 2015, Alashe was drafted 4th overall in the 2015 MLS SuperDraft by the San Jose Earthquakes.  He made his debut on March 7 in a 1–0 defeat to FC Dallas, and scored the first league goal in Avaya Stadium history two weeks later in a 2–1 win over the visiting Chicago Fire.

On July 30, 2018, Alashe signed a deal to join FC Cincinnati on loan from San Jose for the remainder of the 2018 season, then joining the team permanently for the 2019 season for $135,000 in allocation money.

On August 17, 2020, Alashe was traded to Ohio rivals Columbus Crew in exchange for a 2nd round pick in the 2021 MLS SuperDraft, and potentially a conditional $50,000 of General Allocation Money depending on performance. Columbus declined their contract option on Alashe following their 2020 season.

On March 24, 2021, Alashe joined USL Championship club Sacramento Republic FC. Alashe was released by Sacramento following the 2021 season.

International
In January 2016 Alashe received his first call up to the senior United States squad for friendlies against Iceland and Canada but had to withdraw through injury.

Personal life
Alashe is of Nigerian descent.

Career statistics

Honours
Columbus Crew
 MLS Cup: 2020

References

External links

Michigan State University bio 

1993 births
Living people
American soccer players
American sportspeople of Nigerian descent
Association football midfielders
Columbus Crew players
FC Cincinnati (2016–18) players
FC Cincinnati players
Major League Soccer players
Michigan State Spartans men's soccer players
People from Northville, Michigan
Portland Timbers U23s players
Reading United A.C. players
Reno 1868 FC players
Sacramento Republic FC players
San Jose Earthquakes draft picks
San Jose Earthquakes players
Soccer players from Michigan
Sportspeople from Southfield, Michigan
USL Championship players
United States men's under-23 international soccer players
USL League Two players